Wang Jung-Hyun (born October 30, 1976) is a South Korean footballer. He last played for Yantai Yiteng. He formerly played for FC Seoul and Jeonbuk Hyundai Motors.

Club career statistics

External links
 
 National Team Player Record 
 

1976 births
Living people
People from Gwangmyeong
Association football defenders
South Korean footballers
South Korean expatriate footballers
FC Seoul players
Jeonbuk Hyundai Motors players
Zhejiang Yiteng F.C. players
China League One players
K League 1 players
Expatriate footballers in China
Expatriate football managers in China
South Korean expatriate sportspeople in China
South Korean football managers
South Korea international footballers
Guangxi Pingguo Haliao F.C. managers
Sportspeople from Gyeonggi Province